Rab27 is a member of the Rab subfamily of GTPases. Rab27 is post translationally modified by the addition of two geranylgeranyl groups on the two C-terminal cysteines.

Pathology
Mutations that prevent the expression of Rab27 ('knock out' mutations) cause the hypopigmentation and immunodeficiency disorder known as type II Griscelli syndrome, while a decrease in Rab27 prenylation is thought to be involved in choroideremia.

The symptoms of type II Griscelli syndrome have shown that Rab27 is involved in melanosome transport in melanocytes and in cytotoxic killing activity in cytotoxic T lymphoblasts. In melanocytes Rab27 binds the melanosome. The melanosome is transported along the microtubule. Rab27 then recruits Slac2A and myosin Va, these enzymes are essential for the transfer of the melanosomes from the microtubules to actin filaments. The melanosomes can now continue on their path towards the cell periphery. If either Rab27, Slac2A or myosin Va are absent then the melanosomes remain in the perinuclear region of the cell. This disruption in pigmentation results in the hypopigmentation seen in the silvery hair colour of patients with Griscelli syndrome.

External links
 
 

Signal transduction
EC 3.6.5